Caz Frear is a British mystery fiction novelist.  Her 2018 work Sweet Little Lies was published after winning the Richard & Judy "Search for a Bestseller" competition in 2017.

Cat Kinsella books
 Sweet Little Lies (2018)
 Stone Cold Heart (2019)
 Shed No Tears (2020)

TV options
In 2017, Carnival Films purchased TV rights to Sweet Little Lies.

Personal life
Frear grew up in Coventry, England and spent her teenage years dreaming of moving to London and writing a novel. After fulfilling her first dream, it wasn’t until she moved back to Coventry thirteen years later that the second finally came true. She has a degree in History & Politics

References

English crime fiction writers
Year of birth missing (living people)
Living people